Adhipan (അധിപൻ ) is a 1989 Indian Malayalam-language action thriller film directed by K. Madhu and written by Jagadeesh. The film stars Mohanlal, Parvathy and Monisha. The film features background score and songs composed by Shyam. The film was a commercial success.

Plot
Shyamprakash a leading  criminal lawyer in the city. He decides to take revenge against business tycoon, Mohan who had gotten away after murdering his sister.

Cast
 Mohanlal as Advocate Shyam Prakash
 Parvathy Jayaram as Radhika
 Monisha Unni as Geetha
 Devan as Mohan
 Janardhanan as Kaimal
 Sukumaran as SP Nambiar
 Jagadish as Pothen, Junior Advocate of Shyam Prakash
 Maniyanpilla Raju as Gopalakrishnan, Junior Advocate of Shyam Prakash
 M. G. Soman as SP Rajasekharan
 Balan K. Nair as Sukumaran Mash
 Suresh Gopi as himself (Cameo)
 Kuthiravattom Pappu as Raghavettan
 Kaviyoor Ponnamma as Shyam Prakash's Mother
 Kollam Thulasi as Vasudevan
 Prathapachandran as G. K.
 Karamana Janardanan Nair as Minister
 Jagannatha Varma as Dr. K. S. Menon, Radhika's Father
 Mafia Sasi as Goonda
 Rajan Shankaradi as Goonda
 Vijayan Peringode as Goonda

Soundtrack

References

External links
 

1980s Malayalam-language films
Films directed by K. Madhu
Films scored by Shyam (composer)